The 1931 All-Southwest Conference football team consists of American football players chosen by various organizations for All-Southwest Conference teams for the 1931 college football season.  The selectors for the 1931 season included the Associated Press (AP). The AP selected its All-Southwest Conference team with input from sports editors and writers.

The 1931 SMU Mustangs football team was the conference champion with a record of 9–1–1 and placed four players on the first team. SMU halfback Weldon "Speedy" Mason was the only player to be unanimously selected.

The TCU Horned Frogs and Texas Longhorns followed with three players each on the first team. TCU guard Johnny Vaught was selected on every ballot with only one exception. Vaught later served as head football coach at Ole Miss from 1947 to 1970 and was inducted into the College Football Hall of Fame in 1979.

All Southwest selections

Backs
 Weldon Mason, SMU (AP-1 [QB])
 Harrison Spearman, Texas (AP-1 [HB])
 Blanard Spearman, TCU (AP-1 [HB])
 Ernie Koy, Texas (AP-1 [FB])

Ends
 Madison Pruitt, TCU (AP-1)
 George Koontz, SMU (AP-1)

Tackles
 Marion Hammon, SMU (AP-1)
 Carl Moulden, Texas A&M (AP-1)

Guards
 Wilson Cook, Texas (AP-1)
 Johnny Vaught, TCU (AP-1)

Centers
 Alfred Delcambre, SMU (AP-1)

Key
AP = Associated Press

See also
 1931 College Football All-America Team

References

All-Southwest Conference
All-Southwest Conference football teams